William Francis Messner-Loebs (born William Francis Loebs, Jr., February 19, 1949) is an American comics artist and writer from Michigan, also known as Bill Loebs and Bill Messner-Loebs. His hyphenated surname is a combination of his and his wife Nadine's unmarried surnames.

In the 1980s and 1990s he wrote runs of series published by DC Comics, Image Comics, Comico, and other comics publishers, including DC's superhero series Flash and Wonder Woman among others. Additionally he has both written and drawn original creator-owned works, such as Journey: The Adventures of Wolverine MacAlistaire.

Biography
William Messner-Loebs was born in Ferndale, Michigan. His right arm was amputated above the shoulder in infancy because of a cancerous tumor; he writes and draws with his left hand.

Loebs was a friend of Kevin Siembieda, and played in Siembieda's role-playing group in Detroit; in 1981, his mother Frances (Schepeler) Loebs loaned Siembieda the money to start publishing role-playing books for his company Palladium Games.

His first comics work was for Power Comics Company and on Noble Comics' Justice Machine with Mike Gustovich.  His first ongoing series was Journey: The Adventures of Wolverine MacAlistaire, about 19th-century Michigan frontier life, which he both wrote and illustrated. It was published from 1983 to 1986 by Aardvark-Vanaheim and Fantagraphics, followed by a limited series Journey: Wardrums.  He wrote the 31-issue Jonny Quest series published by Comico from 1986 to 1988 and collaborated with artist Adam Kubert on the Jezebel Jade limited series, a spin-off from the Jonny Quest series.

In 1988, he began writing The Flash with issue #15 and continued through #61. He and artist Greg LaRocque introduced Linda Park as a supporting character in the series in The Flash vol. 2 #28 (July 1989). He also reintroduced the Pied Piper as a reformed villain and established the character as gay, in issue #53 (Aug. 1991).

Meanwhile he wrote Dr. Fate #25-41 and the Jaguar series for DC's Impact Comics imprint. He wrote Epicurus the Sage which was illustrated by Sam Kieth, and scripted The Maxx which was illustrated and co-written by Kieth. In 1990, Messner-Loebs became the writer of the Batman newspaper comic strip and wrote the strip until its cancellation the following year.

In 1992 Loebs took over writing the Wonder Woman series, with pencils by Mike Deodato. During his run from #63 to #100, he created the character Artemis of Bana-Mighdall, for whom he wrote the mini-series Artemis: Requiem. Meanwhile he wrote Hawkman #9-27, penciled primarily by Steve Lieber. In 1996 he had a brief run writing Marvel Comics' Thor. From 1997 to 1999 he wrote Impulse #29-49, penciled by Craig Rousseau. In 1999 he wrote the "V2K" mini-series Brave Old World for Vertigo, penciled by Guy Davis.

In 2005, following years of limited freelance work and the loss of his and his wife's home in the early 2000s, Messner-Loebs’s financial condition was publicized in the local newspaper and comics news sites and Internet message boards. Author Clifford Meth teamed up with artist Neal Adams to create a benefit auction to help Messner-Loebs. The two also created an art tribute book entitled Heroes & Villains with all proceeds aiding Messner-Loebs.

His financial situation improved somewhat, and he had a number of works published, including an issue of Green Arrow in 2005, and several pieces in The Three Tenors (Aardwolf Publishing), which he shared credits for along with Clifford Meth and artist Dave Cockrum. A new "Journey" story was included in the one-shot Many Happy Returns in 2008, and IDW Publishing reprinted the original material in paperback. He has done writing for Boom! Studios, including the four-issue Necronomicon and stories for Zombie Tales. He has done illustration work for the 2007 humor book Chicken Wings for the Beer Drinker's Soul and a monthly cartoon for the Livingston [County, MI] Parent Journal. In 2008, he discussed additional, more substantial new works with various publishers. In 2011, he wrote the DC Retroactive: The Flash – The '80s and DC Retroactive: Wonder Woman – The '90s one-shots.

As of early 2018, William Messner-Loebs and his wife have continued to struggle financially, with Messner-Loebs working two part-time positions in Michigan. In 2019, he co-wrote, with Amy Chu, issues #3–5 of the limited series Kiss: The End for Dynamite Entertainment, and contributed to an independent comic book anthology called YEET Presents.

In September 2020, William Messner-Loebs was named Project Editor for Resurgence Comics.

Awards
In 1985, Messner-Loebs was nominated for the Russ Manning Most Promising Newcomer Award. He received an Inkpot Award in 1987 and his Jonny Quest series from Comico was nominated for the Kirby Award for Best Continuing Series and Best New Series that same year. In 1989, Messner-Loebs was nominated for an Eisner Award as Best Writer for Jonny Quest and his Jezebel Jade series was nominated for the Eisner Award for Best Finite Series.

For his work on The Flash, he received the first GLAAD Media Award for Outstanding Comic Book in 1992. He received the Bill Finger Award for Writing Excellence in 2017.

Awards won
 Inkpot Award 1987
 GLAAD Media Award for Outstanding Comic Book 1992
 Macabre Award 2008
 Bill Finger Award 2017

Award Finalist
 Russ Manning Award (for Most Promising Newcomer) 1985
 Kirby Award Best Black-and-White Series (for Journey) 1985
 Kirby Award Best Black-and-White Series (for Journey) 1986
 Kirby Award Best Continuing Series (for Jonny Quest) 1987
 Kirby Award Best New Series (for Jonny Quest) 1987
 Harvey Award Best Writer (for Jonny Quest) 1988
 Eisner Award Best Writer (for Jonny Quest) 1989
 Eisner Award Best Finite Series (for Jezebel Jade) 1989
 Harvey Award Best Graphic Album (for Epicurus the Sage) 1990
 Harvey Award Best Graphic Album of Original Work (for Wonder Woman: Amazonia) 1998

Bibliography

Aardvark-Vanaheim
 A–V in 3–D #1 (1984)
 Cerebus the Aardvark #34–38, 48–49 (backup stories) (1982–1983) 
 Journey: The Adventures of Wolverine MacAlistaire #1–14 (1983–1984)

Aardwolf Productions
 Aardwolf #1 (1994)
 The Uncanny Dave Cockrum... A Tribute (2004)
 The Three Tenors: Off Key (2005)

About Comics
Many Happy Returns (2008)

Angry Isis Press
 Choices: A Pro-Choice Benefit Comic Anthology for the National Organization for Women #1 (1990)

Approbation Comics
Myriad #3 (1995)

A Wave Blue World
Dead Beats: London Calling (2021)

Boom! Studios
 Cthulhu Tales #3, 6, 12 (2008–2009)
 Necronomicon #1–4 (2008)
 Zombie Tales: The Series #3, 5 (2008)

Century Comics
 Actor Comics Presents #1 (2006)

Comico
 Jezebel Jade #1–3 (1988)
 Jonny Quest #1–31 (1986–1988)
 Primer #3 (writer/artist) (1983)
 Silverback #1–3 (1989)

Cost of Paper Comics
 YEET Presents #24, 26–27, 29, 31–34, 36-39, 41–44, 50, 52 (2019–)
YEET Presents Special: Loey the Liger and the Wizard's Tower #1 (2021)
Shamus and Katie #22 (2022)

Dark Horse Comics
 Doc Stearn...Mr. Monster vol. 2 #8 (1991)
 Indiana Jones and the Fate of Atlantis #1–4 (1991)

DC Comics

 Action Comics #658 (1990)
 The Adventures of Superman #471 (1990)
 Aquaman Annual #3 (1997)
 Artemis: Requiem #1–6 (1996)
 Brave Old World #1–4 (2000)
 Cartoon Network Block Party #16 (2006)
 Christmas with the Super-Heroes #2 (1989)
 DC Retroactive: The Flash: The '80s #1 (2011)
 DC Retroactive: Wonder Woman: The '90s #1 (2011) 
 Doctor Fate #25–37, 39–41 (1991–1992)
 Epicurus the Sage #1–2 (1989–1991)
 Fast Forward #3 (1993)
 The Flash #15–28, 30–61, Annual #2–3, Special #1 (1988–1992)
 The Flash 80-Page Giant #2 (1999)
 Flinch #6  (1999)
 Green Arrow vol. 3 #53 (2005)
 Hawkman #9–17, 19–27, #0, Annual #2 (1994–1995)
 Impact Winter Special #1 (1991) 
 Impulse #29–40, 42–49, #1000000, Annual #2 (1997–1999) 
 Jaguar #1–14, Annual #1 (1991–1992)
 Justice League America Annual #7 (1993)
 Justice League Europe #9–12 (1989–1990)
 Justice League Quarterly #5, 10–11 (1991–1993)
 Legends of the DC Universe #4–5 (Wonder Woman) (1998)
 Power of the Atom #12–13 (1989)
 The Powerpuff Girls #56 (2005) 
 Secret Origins #34, 48, Annual #2 (1988–1990)
 Showcase '94 #7 (1994) 
 Speed Force #1 (1997)
 Superman vol. 2 #48 (1990)
 Superman: The Legacy of Superman #1 (1993)
 Wasteland #1–2, 4–6, 8–10, 12, 17–18 (1987–1988) 
 Who's Who in the DC Universe #3 (1990)
 Who's Who: The Definitive Directory of the DC Universe #10 (1985) 
 Wonder Woman vol. 2 #63–64, 66–87, 90–100, #0, Annual #3, Special #1 (1992–1995)
 Wonder Woman: Amazonia #1 (1998)

Disney
 Disney Adventures January 1992

Dynamite Entertainment
KISS: The End #3–5 (2019)

Eclipse Comics
Born to be Wild (1991)
 Doc Stearn...Mr. Monster #1–5 (1985–1986)

Fantagraphics Books

Amazing Heroes #138 ("2nd Annual Swimsuit Issue"), #164 ("Swimsuits '89") (1988–1989)
Amazing Heroes Swimsuit Special #1 (1990) 
 Anything Goes! #5 (1987)
 The Best Comics of the Decade #1 (1990)
Dalgoda #7 (Wolverine MacAlistaire backup story) (1986)
Dinosaur Rex #2–3 (backup story) (1987)
 Journey: The Adventures of Wolverine MacAlistaire #15–27 (1985–1986)
 Journey: Wardrums #1–2 (1987–1990)

First Comics
 Grimjack #12–13 (1985)

Image Comics
 Bliss Alley #1–2 (1997) 
 Darker Image #1 (1993)
 Gen13/The Maxx one-shot (1995)
 MaxiMage #2–7 (1996) 
 The Maxx #1–15, 17–20, 22–23 (1993–1996)

Innovation Publishing
 Justice Machine Summer Spectacular #1 (1990)
 The Maze Agency Annual #1 (1990)

Kitchen Sink Press
Images of Omaha #1 (1992)

Last Gasp
 Strip AIDS U.S.A. (1988)

Literacy Volunteers of Chicago
 Word Warriors #1 (1987)

Marvel Comics
 Cutting Edge #1 (1995)
Epic Battles of the Civil War 1–2 (1998)
 Savage Hulk #1 (1996)
 The Official Handbook of the Marvel Universe Deluxe Edition #2, 9 (1985–1986)
 Thor #495–502 (1996)
 What If...? vol. 2 #82 (1996)

Moonstone
 Moonstone Monsters: Witches #1 (2004)
 Moonstone Noir: Bulldog Drummond #1 (2004)

Noble Comics
 Justice Machine #1–2, Annual #1 (1981–1983)

SD Publishing (Robin Snyder)
 Tales of the Mysterious Traveler #34 (2021)

Ted Valley
 Flint Comix & Entertainment #26–31 (2011)

Thorby Comics
 Scandals #1 (1999)

Wisconsin Writers Association Press
 Human Interest Stuff (2012)

Zenescope Entertainment
 Mankind: The Story of All of Us #2 (2011)

References

External links

William Messner-Loebs at Mike's Amazing World of Comics
William Messner-Loebs at the Unofficial Handbook of Marvel Comics Creators
Official website
 Official Facebook page
 Comic Vine profile
 Interview with William Messner-Loebs at nerdgenic.com

1949 births
20th-century American artists
21st-century American artists
American amputees
American comics artists
American comics writers
Bill Finger Award winners
DC Comics people
Inkpot Award winners
Living people
Marvel Comics people
People from Ferndale, Michigan